The following outline is provided as an overview of and topical guide to the U.S. state of Delaware:

Delaware – U.S. state located on the Atlantic Coast of the United States. The state takes its name from Thomas West, 3rd Baron De La Warr, a British nobleman and Virginia's first colonial governor, after whom (what is now called) Cape Henlopen was originally named. Delaware is the second smallest state (after Rhode Island). The history of the state's economic and industrial development is closely tied to the impact of the Du Pont family, founder of E. I. du Pont de Nemours and Company, one of the world's largest chemical companies. Delaware was one of the 13 original states participating in the American Revolution and on December 7, 1787, became the first to ratify the Constitution of the United States.

General reference 

 Names
 Common name: Delaware
 Pronunciation:  
 Official name: State of Delaware
 Abbreviations and name codes
 Postal symbol:  DE
 ISO 3166-2 code:  US-DE
 Internet second-level domain:  .de.us
 Nicknames
Chemical Capital
Corporate Capital (due to the state's business-friendly laws)
 Diamond State (allusion to the state flag)
 Blue Hen State or Blue Hen Chicken State
 The First State (Delaware was the first state to ratify the Constitution; currently used on license plates)
Home of Tax Free Shopping
New Sweden
Peach State
 Small Wonder
Uncle Sam's Pocket Handkerchief
 Adjectival: Delaware
 Demonym: Delawarean

Geography of Delaware 

Geography of Delaware
 Delaware is: a U.S. state, a federal state of the United States of America
 Location:
 Northern hemisphere
 Western hemisphere
 Americas
 North America
 Anglo America
 Northern America
 United States of America
 Contiguous United States
 Eastern United States
 East Coast of the United States
 Northeast megalopolis
 Mid-Atlantic states
 South Atlantic States
 Population of Delaware: 897,934 (2010 U.S. Census)
 Area of Delaware:
 Atlas of Delaware

Places in Delaware 

Places in Delaware
 Historic places in Delaware
 National Historic Landmarks in Delaware
 National Register of Historic Places listings in Delaware
 Bridges on the National Register of Historic Places in Delaware
 National Natural Landmarks in Delaware
 National parks in Delaware: First State National Historical Park. See List of areas in the United States National Park System.
 State parks in Delaware

Environment of Delaware 

 Climate of Delaware
 Delaware State Wildlife Areas
 Fishing in Delaware
 Geology of Delaware
 Protected areas in Delaware
 State forests of Delaware
 Superfund sites in Delaware

Natural geographic features of Delaware 
 Rivers of Delaware

Regions of Delaware

Administrative divisions of Delaware 

 The three counties of the state of Delaware
 Municipalities in Delaware
 Cities in Delaware (comingled with other municipalities)
 State capital of Delaware:
 City nicknames in Delaware
 Sister cities in Delaware
 Towns in Delaware (comingled with other municipalities)

Demography of Delaware 

Demographics of Delaware

Government and politics of Delaware 

Politics of Delaware
 Form of government: U.S. state government
 United States congressional delegations from Delaware
 Delaware State Capitol
 Elections in Delaware
 Political party strength in Delaware

Branches of the government of Delaware 

Government of Delaware

Executive branch of the government of Delaware 
Governor of Delaware
Lieutenant Governor of Delaware
 Secretary of State of Delaware
 State departments
 Delaware Department of Transportation

Legislative branch of the government of Delaware 
List of United States senators from Delaware
List of United States representatives from Delaware
 Delaware General Assembly
1st Delaware General Assembly
2nd Delaware General Assembly
3rd Delaware General Assembly
4th Delaware General Assembly
5th Delaware General Assembly
6th Delaware General Assembly
7th Delaware General Assembly
8th Delaware General Assembly
9th Delaware General Assembly
10th Delaware General Assembly
11th Delaware General Assembly
12th Delaware General Assembly
13th Delaware General Assembly
14th Delaware General Assembly
15th Delaware General Assembly
16th Delaware General Assembly
17th Delaware General Assembly
18th Delaware General Assembly
19th Delaware General Assembly
20th Delaware General Assembly
21st Delaware General Assembly
22nd Delaware General Assembly
23rd Delaware General Assembly
24th Delaware General Assembly
25th Delaware General Assembly
26th Delaware General Assembly
27th Delaware General Assembly
28th Delaware General Assembly
29th Delaware General Assembly
30th Delaware General Assembly
31st Delaware General Assembly
32nd Delaware General Assembly
33rd Delaware General Assembly
34th Delaware General Assembly
35th Delaware General Assembly
36th Delaware General Assembly
37th Delaware General Assembly
38th Delaware General Assembly
39th Delaware General Assembly
40th Delaware General Assembly
41st Delaware General Assembly
42nd Delaware General Assembly
43rd Delaware General Assembly
44th Delaware General Assembly
45th Delaware General Assembly
46th Delaware General Assembly
47th Delaware General Assembly
48th Delaware General Assembly
49th Delaware General Assembly
50th Delaware General Assembly
51st Delaware General Assembly
52nd Delaware General Assembly
53rd Delaware General Assembly
54th Delaware General Assembly
55th Delaware General Assembly
56th Delaware General Assembly
57th Delaware General Assembly
58th Delaware General Assembly
59th Delaware General Assembly
60th Delaware General Assembly
61st Delaware General Assembly
62nd Delaware General Assembly
63rd Delaware General Assembly
64th Delaware General Assembly
65th Delaware General Assembly
66th Delaware General Assembly
67th Delaware General Assembly
68th Delaware General Assembly
69th Delaware General Assembly
70th Delaware General Assembly
 Delaware Senate
 Delaware House of Representatives
 List of Delaware General Assembly sessions

Judicial branch of the government of Delaware 

Courts of Delaware
 Supreme Court of Delaware

Law and order in Delaware 

 Cannabis in Delaware
 Capital punishment in Delaware: yes. See Capital punishment in the United States.
 Individuals executed in Delaware
 Constitution of Delaware
 Crime in Delaware
 Gun laws in Delaware
 Law enforcement in Delaware
 Law enforcement agencies in Delaware
 Delaware State Police
 Same-sex marriage in Delaware
 Delaware General Corporation Law

Military in Delaware 

 Delaware Air National Guard
 Delaware Army National Guard

History of Delaware

History of Delaware

History of Delaware, by period 

Indigenous peoples
Netherlands colony of Nieuw-Nederland, 1624–1652
Swedish colony of Nya Sverige, 1638–1655
Netherlands province of Nieuw-Nederland, 1652–1664
English Province of New-York, (1664–1681)-1688
English Colony of Pennsylvania, 1681–1707
Lower Counties on the Delaware, 1704–1776
British Colony of Pennsylvania, 1707–1776
Lower Counties on the Delaware, 1704–1776
French and Indian War, 1754–1763
Treaty of Paris of 1763
American Revolutionary War, April 19, 1775 – September 3, 1783
United States Declaration of Independence, July 4, 1776
Treaty of Paris, September 3, 1783
State of Delaware since 1776
Twelfth state to ratify the Articles of Confederation and Perpetual Union, signed February 22, 1779
First State to ratify the Constitution of the United States of America on December 7, 1787
American Civil War, April 12, 1861 – May 13, 1865
Delaware in the American Civil War
Border state, 1861–1865
 Effects of Hurricane Isabel in Delaware

History of Delaware, by region

Cities 
 History of Dover

Counties 
 History of Kent County
 History of New Castle County
 History of Sussex County

Culture of Delaware 

Culture of Delaware
 Festivals in Delaware
 Museums in Delaware
 Religion in Delaware
 The Church of Jesus Christ of Latter-day Saints in Delaware
 Episcopal Diocese of Delaware
 Scouting in Delaware
 State symbols of Delaware
 Flag of the State of Delaware 
 Great Seal of the State of Delaware

The Arts in Delaware 
 Music of Delaware

Sports in Delaware 

Sports in Delaware
 Professional sports teams in Delaware

Economy and infrastructure of Delaware 

Economy of Delaware
Fishing in Delaware
 Communications in Delaware
 Newspapers in Delaware
 Radio stations in Delaware
 Television stations in Delaware
 Health care in Delaware
 Hospitals in Delaware
 Transportation in Delaware
 Airports in Delaware
 Delaware State Route System
 Numbered routes in Delaware
 Delaware Byways
 Vehicle registration plates of Delaware

Education in Delaware 

Education in Delaware
 Schools in Delaware
 School districts in Delaware
 High schools in Delaware
 Colleges and universities in Delaware
 University of Delaware
 Delaware State University

See also

Topic overview:
Delaware

Index of Delaware-related articles

References

External links 

 

Delaware Tourism homepage
Delaware Map Data
Energy & Environmental Data for Delaware
USGS real-time, geographic, and other scientific resources of Delaware
U.S. Census Bureau
Delaware State Facts
 2000 Census of Population and Housing for Delaware, U.S. Census Bureau

Delaware State Databases - Annotated list of searchable databases produced by Delaware state agencies and compiled by the Government Documents Roundtable of the American Library Association.

 
 
 
Delaware
Delaware